"The Wanton Song" is a song by English rock band Led Zeppelin from their sixth studio album, 1975's Physical Graffiti. It was developed from a jam session during rehearsals.

Recording
For his guitar solo, Page employed a backwards echo (where the echo is heard before the note), and also put his guitar through a Leslie speaker. This was a technique Page had himself used as far back as his work with the Yardbirds, and faced serious opposition from audio engineers when he tried it on the earliest Led Zeppelin recordings.

Live performances
"The Wanton Song" was played live during some of the Led Zeppelin's European and American concerts in 1975, but was discontinued. On 8 May 1998, Page and Plant performed it on Later... with Jools Holland.

See also
List of cover versions of Led Zeppelin songs"The Wanton Song" entries

References

1975 songs
Led Zeppelin songs
Song recordings produced by Jimmy Page
Songs written by Jimmy Page
Songs written by Robert Plant